State Route 219 (SR 219) is a  state highway in Dallas, Perry, and Bibb counties in Alabama, United States, that serves as a connector route between Selma and Centreville.

Route description

The southern terminus of SR 219 is located at its intersection with SR 22 in Selma. From this point, the route travels in a northward direction before terminating at SR 5 north of Centreville. SR 219 has brief concurrencies with SR 14 northwest of Selma, with SR 183 in northwestern Perry County, and with SR 25 and US 82 in Centreville.

Major intersections

See also

References

External links

 Alabama 219 Ends

219
Transportation in Dallas County, Alabama
Transportation in Perry County, Alabama
Transportation in Bibb County, Alabama
Selma, Alabama